The Sun Gro Centre is a multi-purpose recreation complex located in the town of Beausejour, Manitoba. The complex features a 1,100 seat ice hockey arena, a curling club, an outdoor pool, and an indoor walking track.  

The complex opened in 2002 and was completed at a cost of $2.75 million. The project was primarily funded by the taxpayers of Beausejour and the Rural Municipality of Brokenhead. The federal government contributed $250,000. The naming rights to the facility were sold to Sun Gro Horticulture.

The Sun Gro Centre is the home arena for the Beausejour Beavers of the Manitoba Senior Hockey League and Eastman Selects of the Manitoba Midget 'AAA' Hockey League. From 2007 to 2009, the Beausejour Blades of the Manitoba Junior Hockey League played out of the Sun Gro Centre, before relocating to Steinbach.  Beausejour's minor hockey and ringette teams also play their home games at the arena.

The Sun Gro Centre has hosted two Manitoba provincial curling championships – the 2004 Scott Tournament of Hearts and the 2011 Safeway Championship.

External links
Official Website

References

Indoor arenas in Manitoba
Indoor ice hockey venues in Canada

Eastman Region, Manitoba
Sport in Eastman Region, Manitoba